A capital guarantee product means that when an investor buys, or "enters", this specific structured product he is guaranteed to get back at maturity a part or the totality of the money he invested on day one. Examples of capital guarantees include bond plus option, usually bond plus call, and constant proportion portfolio insurance.

Derivatives (finance)